The brown cave salamander (Speleomantes genei), also known as Gene's cave salamander, Sardinian cave salamander, or simply Sardinian salamander, is a species of salamander in the family Plethodontidae. It is endemic to Sardinia (Italy). Its natural habitats are temperate forests, rocky areas, caves, and subterranean habitats (other than caves). It is threatened by habitat loss.

References

Speleomantes
Cave salamanders
Fauna of Sardinia
Amphibians of Europe
Endemic fauna of Italy
Amphibians described in 1838
Taxonomy articles created by Polbot